The flag of Omsk Oblast is the official symbol of Omsk Oblast in Russia.

Description
The flag of Omsk Oblast is a rectangular cloth of three vertical bands of equal size: the right and left red and white medium. In the centre of the white band, there is a blue vertical wavy azure pole which is 1/3 of its width.

The ratio of the flag's width to its length is 2:3.

The interpretation of symbols
The main background of the flag of Omsk Oblast is red. It symbolizes bravery, courage, fearlessness. It is the colour of life, charity, and love.

The white symbolizes nobility, purity, justice, generosity, and indicates the climatic features of Siberia.

The wavy azure (blue) post symbolizes the Irtysh River, the main waterway of the oblast. Allegorically, the blue reflects beauty, majesty, and gentleness.

References

Omsk Oblast
Omsk Oblast